A mano (Spanish for hand) is a ground stone tool used with a metate to process or grind food by hand.
It is also known by the Nahuatl term metlapil.

History 
Manos were used in prehistoric times to process wild seeds, nuts, and other food, generally used with greater frequency in the Archaic period, when people became more reliant upon local wild plant food for their diet.  Later, Manos and metates were used to process cultivated maize.

In its early use in the American Southwest, the mano and metate were used to grind wild plants.  The mano began as a one-handed tool. Once the maize cultivation became more prevalent, the mano became a larger, two-handed tool that more efficiently ground food against an evolved basin or trough metate.

Besides food, Manos and metates were used to separate and pulverize clay from earthen debris and stones.  The resulting clay was used for pottery-making.

Grinding process 

A Mano, a smooth hand-held stone, is used against a metate, typically a large stone with a depression or bowl.  The movement of the Mano against the metate consists of a circular, rocking or chopping grinding motion using one or both hands.

Ancient Pueblo People often set up work rooms, called mealing rooms, that were established with sets of manos and metates for mass grinding efforts.

See also
 Bedrock metate
 Grinding slab
 Quern-stone

References

Further reading
 Caple, Chris. Objects: Reluctant Witnesses to the Past
 Morris, Donald H. (Summer 1990). "Changes in Groundstone following the introduction of maize into the American Southwest." Journal of Anthropological Research. 46(2).

External links

 Western artifacts - hard stone tools

Food grinding tools
Lithics
Mesoamerican artifacts
Mesoamerican cuisine
Mexican food preparation utensils
Indigenous tools of the Americas
Native American cuisine
Science and technology in Mesoamerica
Stone objects